W.C. Madden is a retired journalist, teacher and author who has written multiple books about baseball, including two about the AAGPBL. He has also written about the Western League and the College World Series. While much of his work is based on baseball, he has also written about the history of Indianapolis, Indiana.

Partial list of books authored and co-authored
All-American Girls Professional Baseball League Record Book
Baseball's 1st-Year Player Draft, Team by Team Through 1999
Baseball in Indianapolis
Baseball Stories for the Soul
Crown Hill Cemetery
Haynes-Apperson and America’s First Practical Automobile: A History
Indianapolis
Indianapolis In Vintage Postcards
Monticello
P.S. Remembering Bush Stadium
The College World Series
The College World Series: A Baseball History, 1947-2003
The Dutiful Dozen
The Hoosiers of Summer
The Indy 500: 1956-1965
The Western League: A Baseball History, 1885 through 1999
The Women of the All-American Girls Professional Baseball League

References

American non-fiction writers
Writers from Indiana
Living people
Year of birth missing (living people)